Saifee Hospital is a healthcare facility at Charni Road, Mumbai, India, overlooking the Arabian Sea. The head of the Dawoodi Bohra faith, Syedna Mohammad Burhanuddin, dedicated the hospital to the memory of his revered father, Syedna Taher Saifuddin.

History
Saifee Hospital was established by the Dawoodi Bohras in 1948 with the aim of providing safe, ethical and affordable medical assistance to people of all faiths and socio-economic backgrounds.  In 2000, the foundation of a new hospital on the existing premises was laid down by Dr Syedna Mohammed Burhanuddin. Construction commenced in 2001 and the new hospital was commissioned on 4 June 2005 in the presence of the Prime minister of India, Dr. Manmohan Singh. The architecture of the hospital features a combination of classical Arabian (with domes and arches) and contemporary (with glass curtain facades) styles.

Services
The hospital has approximately 257 beds, as well as 44 ICU beds, and 9 operating theaters, and conducts over 10,000 surgeries a year.  

Saifee Hospital specializes in bariatric surgeries, cardiology, critical care medicine, dentistry, dermatology, gynecology, hepatology, oncology, neurology, nephrology, ophthalmology, neonatology, high dose radioactive therapy units, and Pressurized Intra Peritoneal Aerosol Chemotherapy (PIPAC). The hospital features a highly advanced Robotic Surgical System to facilitate the surgeon in performing complex but minimally invasive surgery.

In the aftermath of the 2011 Mumbai bombings, Saifee Hospital provided free treatment to victims and others affected by the bomb blast

References

External links
 Saifee Hospital, Official site

Hospital buildings completed in 2005
Hospitals in Mumbai
Dawoodi Bohras
Hospitals established in 1948
1948 establishments in Bombay State